1995 Elections to Fife Council were held on the 6 April 1995 and were the first for the newly formed Unitary authority for Fife Council, which was created under the Local Government etc (Scotland) Act 1994

Election results

Turnout was 42.2%

Party performance
Labour performed very well continuing control of its majority.

Changes since last election

Ward results

References

External links

1995 Scottish local elections
1995
20th century in Fife
April 1995 events in the United Kingdom